The 1964 NAIA football season was the ninth season of college football sponsored by the NAIA. The season was played from August to December 1964, culminating in the ninth annual NAIA Football National Championship, played this year at ARC Stadium in Augusta, Georgia.

Concordia (MN) and Sam Houston State played to a 7–7 tie and were declared co-national champions. This was the first NAIA national title for both teams.

Conference standings

Postseason

See also
 1964 NCAA University Division football season
 1964 NCAA College Division football season

References

 
NAIA Football National Championship